Aprasia is a genus of lizards in the family Pygopodidae. The genus is endemic to Australia. The species in the genus Aprasia are worm-like, burrowing lizards. At least four of the species are oviparous.

Species
The genus Aprasia contains the following species:
Aprasia aurita  – eared worm-lizard, mallee worm-lizard
Aprasia clairae 
Aprasia haroldi  – Shark Bay worm-lizard
Aprasia inaurita  – mallee worm-lizard, red-tailed worm-lizard
Aprasia litorea  – Gnaraloo worm-lizard
Aprasia parapulchella  – granite worm-lizard, pink-tailed worm-lizard
Aprasia picturata 
Aprasia pseudopulchella  – Flinders Ranges worm-lizard
Aprasia pulchella  – pretty worm-lizard
Aprasia repens  – sedgelands worm-lizard
Aprasia rostrata  – Exmouth worm-lizard, Hermite Island worm-lizard
Aprasia smithi  – Zuytdorp worm-lizard
Aprasia striolata  – striated worm-lizard
Aprasia wicherina  – Wicherina worm-lizard

Nota bene: A binomial authority in parentheses indicates that the species was originally described in a genus other than Aprasia.

References

Further reading
Boulenger GA (1885). Catalogue of the Lizards in the British Museum (Natural History). Second Edition. Volume I. Geckonidæ, Eublepharidæ, Uroplatidæ, Pygopodidæ, Agamidæ. London: Trustees of the British Museum (Natural History). (Taylor and Francis, printers). xii + 436 pp. + Plates I-XXXII. (Genus Aprasia, p. 245).
Gray JE (1839). Catalogue of the Slender-tongued Saurians, with Descriptions of many new Genera and Species. Ann. Mag. Nat. Hist. [First Series] 2: 331–337. (Aprasia, new genus, pp. 331–332).

 
Legless lizards
Pygopodids of Australia
Lizard genera
Pygopodidae
Taxa named by John Edward Gray